Christ the Protector is a statue of Jesus Christ constructed in Encantado, Rio Grande do Sul, Brazil.

The statue was started in 2019, and completed in April 22, 2022, with a height of 43 m (140 ft) with its pedestal, making it the world's third tallest Jesus statue (after Jesus Buntu Burake and Christ the King, Świebodzin) and 5m taller than the [[Christ the Redeemer (statue)|Christ the Redeemer]]'' statue in Rio de Janeiro. Construction began in 2019 and was the idea of local mayor Adroaldo Conzatti, who died of COVID-19 in March 2021. 

The Friends of Christ Association (AACristo) organization funded the $350,000 to build it from donations and also oversaw the construction of the statue. The venue will be open to the public sometime in 2023, said Robison Gonzatti, AACristo's vice president.

Though the surrounding tourist complex is still under construction, visitors can visit the statue up close during Saturdays, Sundays and Brazilian holidays as indicated in their website.

References 

Buildings and structures in Rio Grande do Sul
Colossal statues of Jesus
Statues in Brazil